Ciarán P. Murphy (born 30 May 1940) is a former Irish Fianna Fáil politician who was a Teachta Dála (TD) for Wicklow from 1973 to 1982.

A secondary school teacher before entering politics, Murphy was elected to Dáil Éireann on his first attempt, at the 1973 general election. He defeated the sitting TD Paudge Brennan, who had left Fianna Fáil over the Arms Crisis and was standing as a candidate for the short-lived breakaway party Aontacht Éireann. Murphy was re-elected at the next three general elections, before losing his seat at the November 1982 general election to Paudge Brennan, who had rejoined Fianna Fáil.

In October 1982, Murphy had been one of the "Gang of 22" Fianna Fáil TDs who had voted in favour of a motion of no confidence in the Taoiseach Charles Haughey's leadership of the party. The motion had been tabled by Kildare TD Charlie McCreevy, but one of its main backers was Desmond O'Malley. O'Malley was expelled from Fianna Fáil in 1985 and founded a new political party, the Progressive Democrats (PDs).

Murphy, who was no longer a member of the Dáil, joined the PDs and stood as a Progressive Democrat candidate in Wicklow at the 1989 general election. He was unsuccessful, and did not stand again.

References

1940 births
Living people
Local councillors in County Wicklow
Fianna Fáil TDs
Progressive Democrats politicians
Members of the 20th Dáil
Members of the 21st Dáil
Members of the 22nd Dáil
Members of the 23rd Dáil
Irish schoolteachers